O atsidas is a 1962 Greek comedy film directed by Giannis Dalianidis and starring Dinos Iliopoulos, Zoi Laskari and Vangelis Protopappas.

Synopsis
It has a lovely entanglement for the first, which he asked his brother of the lovely lady that they did not marry, they were first that they prepared to recover his brother.

Cast
Dinos Iliopoulos as Alekos Kourouzos
Zoi Laskari as Anna Kourouzou
Pantelis Zervos as Thodoros Kourouzos
Joly Garbi as Areti Kourouzou
Mairi Voulgari as Voula Mavrofrydi
Vangelis Protopappas as Grigoris Mavrofrydis
Thanassis Vengos as Thrasyvoulas
Kostas Papachristos as Grigoris's girlfriend brother
Photographic portions of the movie were done by Dinos Iliopoulos, Mairi Linda and Manolis Chiotis.

Other information
The movie is based on a theatrical play by Dimitris Psathas Exohikon Kendron o Eros (Εξοχικόν Κέντρον Ο Έρως'')
Thanassis Vengos made his second role, he unfolded his comical talents and became popular.
The movie was filmed in Thessaloniki
It was annually ranked fifth in tickets (69,414) for that year.

External links
O atsidas at Finos Films

O atsidas at cine.gr 

1962 films
1962 comedy films
1960s Greek-language films
Finos Film films
Greek comedy films
Films directed by Giannis Dalianidis